Fonzo is an unincorporated community in Ritchie County, West Virginia, United States. Fonzo was established in 1901. The community was named after a local baby.

References 

Unincorporated communities in Ritchie County, West Virginia
Unincorporated communities in West Virginia